The 2018–19 Regional Super50 was the 45th edition of the Regional Super50, the domestic limited-overs cricket competition for the countries of the Cricket West Indies (CWI). The tournament started on 3 October 2018. The players' draft for the tournament took place in May 2018. The Windward Islands were the defending champions.

In August 2018, both the United States national cricket team and the Canada national cricket team were invited to compete. Their participation was confirmed the following month. They were joined by the six regular teams of West Indian domestic cricket (Barbados, Guyana, Jamaica, the Leeward Islands, Trinidad and Tobago, and the Windward Islands), the Combined Campuses and Colleges team and the West Indies B cricket team.

On 6 October 2018, Chris Gayle played in his final List A cricket match for Jamaica, scoring a century, with Jamaica beating Barbados by 33 runs.

Following the conclusion of the group stage, Guyana and Trinidad and Tobago from Group A along with Combined Campuses and Colleges and Jamaica from Group B had all progressed to the knockout stage of the competition.

In the first semi-final, Guyana beat Jamaica by one wicket, with Guyana's captain, Leon Johnson, scoring his first century in List A cricket. In the second semi-final, Combined Campuses and Colleges beat Trinidad and Tobago by seven wickets, with Akeem Jordan taking a five-wicket haul.

In the final, Combined Campuses and Colleges beat Guyana by six wickets to win their first Regional Super50 title.

Squads
Prior to the start of the tournament, players were selected in the Professional Cricket League draft: In September 2018, Cricket West Indies (CWI) confirmed the final squads for the tournament. Cricket Canada announced their squad on 1 October 2018. The squad for the United States was named two days later.

Points tables

Group A

Group B

Fixtures

Group A

Group B

Finals

References

External links
 Series home at ESPN Cricinfo

2018 in West Indian cricket
Regional Super50
Regional Super50 seasons